The Divine Comedy by Dante Alighieri is an epic poem in Italian written between 1308 and 1321 that describes its author's journey through the Christian afterlife. The three cantiche of the poem, Inferno, Purgatorio, and Paradiso, describe hell, purgatory, and heaven respectively. The poem is considered one of the greatest works of world literature and helped establish Dante's Tuscan dialect as the standard form of the Italian language. It has been translated over 400 times into at least 52 different languages.

Though English poets Geoffrey Chaucer and John Milton referenced and partially translated Dante's works in the 14th and 17th centuries respectively, it took until the early 19th century for the first full English translation of the Divine Comedy to be published. This was over 300 years after the first Latin (1416), Spanish (1515), and French (1500s) translations had been written. By 1906, Dante scholar Paget Toynbee calculated that the Divine Comedy had been touched upon by over 250 translators and sixty years later bibliographer Gilbert F. Cunningham observed that the frequency of English Dante translations was only increasing with time. As of 2022, the Divine Comedy has been translated into English more times than it has been translated into any other language.

List of translations 
A complete listing and criticism of all English translations of at least one of the three cantiche (parts) was made by Cunningham in 1966. The table below summarises Cunningham's data with additions between 1966 and the present, many of which are taken from the Dante Society of America's yearly North American bibliography and 's international bibliography. Many more translations of individual lines or cantos exist, but these are too numerous for the scope of this list.

See also 
 Divine Comedy in popular culture

Notes

References

Bibliography 

 
 
 
 
 
 
  Freely available manuscript of the above text

Further reading 

Dante Alighieri: Divine Comedy. Ugolinomania - Early English Translations of the Ugolino Episode from Chaucer to Jennings containing translations from Geoffrey Chaucer (c. 1340s–1400), Jonathan Richardson (1665–1745), Thomas Gray (1716–1771), Giuseppe Marc'Antonio Baretti (1719–1789), Joseph Warton (1722–1800), Frederick Howard, 5th Earl of Carlisle (1748–1825), Thomas Warton (1728–1790), Charles Rogers (1711–1784), Henry Boyd (c. 1750–1832) and Henry Constantine Jennings (1731–1819).
 "Dante in English" from The Cambridge Companion to Dante (1993)
 American Dante Bibliography from the Dante Society of America

External links 

 Translations: Rogers, Cary, Howard, Dayman, Carlyle, Bannerman, Whyte, Longfellow, Norton, Griffith, Mandelbaum, Hollander and Hollander (Poem; Commentary)
 Dante Poliglatta

Divine Comedy
Divine Comedy
Translation-related lists